Flight 112 may refer to:
 Paninternational Flight 112, crashed on 6 September 1971
 Alitalia Flight 112, crashed on 5 May 1972
 Air India Flight 112 plot, foiled terrorist plot in May 1986
 Air China Flight 112, flight that carried SARS on 15 March 2003
 Pamir Airways Flight 112, crashed on 17 May 2010
 Peruvian Airlines Flight 112, flight that caught fire on 28 March 2017

0112